The Isle of Skye Music Festival was an annual music festival that took place on the Ashaig Airstrip near Broadford on the Isle of Skye in Scotland.

Overview
It was one of the earliest festivals in the year, occurring in late May or June, a time known on the Island to be the driest in the year. From this location there are views of the coast and Cuillin hills; organisers describe it as "the most impressive backdrop of any UK festival".

The festival won the "Most Fan-Friendly Festival" award at the 2006 UK Festival Awards. The Festival offered on-site parking, a dedicated bus service and camping facilities.

The festival includes a mix of Scottish and international artists. It also seeks to promote the island's cultural identity by featuring lesser known local bands and by selling traditional food such as porridge and local wild boar burgers.

In 2007 the festival was included as part of the Highland 2007 culture festival, bands performing included Primal Scream, Kasabian and Mylo.

The 2008 festival was cancelled after the organisers ran up over £500,000 of debts, and it was reported some musicians and suppliers had not yet been paid for work at the previous festival. The shortfall was due to much lower than expected crowds at the previous event, after spending large amounts of money on bands. 

In 2015 a new two-day event called Skye Live Festival succeeded, taking place in Portree on the Isle of Skye.

2007 Line up
The festival took place on 25 and 26 May 2007.

Main stage

Non stop stage

Shipping forecast stage

ITSON stage

References

External links

Music festivals in Scotland
Isle of Skye
Music in Highland (council area)
2005 establishments in Scotland
Music festivals established in 2005